Portets station (French: Gare de Portets) is a French railway station located in the commune of Portets, Gironde department in the southwestern Nouvelle-Aquitaine region of the country. Established at an elevation of 14 meters, the station is located at kilometric point (KP) 20.275 on the Bordeaux–Sète railway, between the stations of Beautiran and Arbanats.

As of 2023, the station is owned and operated by the SNCF and served by TER Nouvelle-Aquitaine trains.

History 
The station was put into service on 31 May 1855 by the Compagnie des chemins de fer du Midi et du Canal latéral à la Garonne (CF du Midi), alongside the opening of a section of railway between Bordeaux and Langon on the Bordeaux–Sète railway.

In 2019, the SNCF estimated that 121,322 passengers traveled through the station, compared with 101,476 in 2018 and 91,047 in 2017.

Services

Passenger services 
Classified as a PANG (point d'accès non géré), the station is unstaffed and equipped with automatic ticket dispensers.

Train services 
As of 2022, the station is served by the following services:
Local services (TER Nouvelle-Aquitaine 43.2U) Bordeaux ↔ Langon

Intermodality 
The station has onsite bike racks, while car parking is located within a close proximity.

Image gallery

See also 

 List of SNCF stations in Nouvelle-Aquitaine

References

Railway stations in France opened in 1855
Railway stations in Gironde